K. Sankunni was an Indian film editor who worked predominantly in Malayalam film industry. He has edited around 300 films. He edited mostly Malayalam films and also have some credits in Tamil, Telugu, Kannada, and Hindi films as well. Sankunni won the Kerala State Film Award for Best Editor in 1988.

Filmography

References

External links
 

2001 deaths
Malayalam film editors
Tamil film editors
Telugu film editors
Kannada film editors
Hindi film editors